Buddhism in Scotland is a relatively recent phenomenon. In Scotland Buddhists represent 0.24% of the population or around 13,000 people.

History of Buddhism in Scotland
The earliest Buddhist influence on Scotland came through its imperial connections with South East Asia, and as a result the early connections were with the Theravada traditions of Burma, Thailand, and Sri Lanka. To begin with, 150 years ago, this response was primarily scholarly, and a tradition of study grew up that eventually resulted in the foundation of the Pali Text Society, which undertook the huge task of translating the Pali Canon of Theravada Buddhist texts into English.

The rate of growth was slow but steady through the century, and the 1950s saw the development of interest in Zen Buddhism. In 1967 Kagyu Samyé Ling Monastery and Tibetan Centre was founded by Tibetan lamas and refugees Chögyam Trungpa Rinpoche and Akong Rinpoche. It is in Eskdalemuir, in south west Scotland and is the largest Tibetan Buddhist centre in Western Europe, and part of the Karma Kagyu tradition.

As well there are other Buddhism-based new religious movements such as the New Kadampa Tradition, Triratna Buddhist Community and Sōka Gakkai International. The Triratna community maintains a retreat centre at Balquhidder in the Trossachs.

Demographics
In 2001 census, the Buddhism constituted 0.1% or 6,830 people of the Scotland. It increased to 0.2% or 12,795 people in 2011 census.

Samyé Ling

Kagyu Samyé Ling Monastery and Tibetan Centre was founded in 1967 by two spiritual masters, Choje Akong Tulku Rinpoche and Chogyam Trungpa Rinpoche, who both belong to the Kagyu school of Tibetan Buddhism. It was the first Tibetan Buddhist Centre to be established in the West and was named after Samye, the very first monastery to be established in Tibet. In 1977, during the 16th Karmapa's second visit to Samye Ling, he assured Akong Rinpoche about the longer-term future of Buddhism in the West and at Samye Ling. It is from this encounter that the  Samye Project was born.

There is an associated community on Holy Isle which is owned by Samyé Ling  The settlements on the island include the Centre for World Peace and Health and a traditional retreat centre for nuns. Samyé Ling has also established centres in more than 20 countries, including Belgium, Ireland, Poland, South Africa, Spain and Switzerland.

Notable Scottish Buddhists
 Stephen Batchelor
 Alex Ferns
 Rupert Gethin
 Ajahn Candasiri

See also

 Holy Isle, Firth of Clyde
 Buddhism in the United Kingdom
 Buddhism in England
 Buddhism in Wales
 Buddhism by country
 Demographics of Scotland
 British Asian
 Asian-Scots
 New Scots

External links
 Edinburgh Drikung Kagyu Sangha
 Edinburgh Buddhist Centre (FWBO)
 Scotland - List of Buddhist groups in Scotland
 Portobello Buddhist Priory (OBC)
 Edinburgh Theravadan Buddhists
 Scottish Wild Geese Sangha (COI)
 Diamond Way Buddhism
 Aberdeen Buddhist Group
 Glasgow Zen Group

References

 
Scotland
History of religion in Scotland
Immigration to Scotland
Religion in Scotland
Sco